Lucky Leif and the Longships is a 1975 record album by Robert Calvert, produced by Brian Eno.

It is a concept album dealing with how American culture might have been different had the Vikings managed to colonise the continent. The album is a tour through various styles of American music ("The Lay of the Surfers" is a Beach Boys parody), filled with references to modern American culture and ancient Norse myths and legends. The album was re-released in the late 1990s by BGO Records.

Track listing
All songs by Robert Calvert; arranged by Robert Calvert and Paul Rudolph

 "Ship of Fools"
 "The Lay of the Surfers"
 "Voyaging to Vinland"
 "The Making of Midgard"
 "Brave New World"
 "Magical Potion"
 "Moonshine in the Mountains"
 "Storm Chant of the Skraelings"
 "Volstead O Vodeo Do"
 "Phase Locked Loop"
 "Ragna Rock"

Bonus tracks
 "Howzat!"
 "Cricket Lovely Reggae (Cricket Star)"

Personnel

Robert Calvert - vocals, trumpet, piano, harmonica
Andy Roberts - organ, guitars, backing vocals
Paul Fraser Rudolph - guitars, bass guitar, backing vocals
Michael Moorcock - banjo
Simon House - violin
Nik Turner - saxophone
Sal Maida - bass guitar
Brian Turrington - bass guitar & piano
Mike Nicholls - drums, percussion
Technical
Brian Eno - producer, synthesizer
Rhett Davies - engineer
Guy Bidford, Robert Ash, Sid Bucknor - assistant engineers
Tony Hyde - illustration

Audio CD Remasterer: Paschal Byrne

References

External links
 Lucky Leif and the Longships on Amazon.com

1975 albums
Concept albums
Robert Calvert albums
Albums produced by Brian Eno
United Artists Records albums